Lee Spencer (born Lee Alan Spencer-Todd in 1963) is an English electronic musician, music theorist and record producer. As a solo artist, he is probably best known as the creator of Cavewaves a collection of ambient new age albums. Lee first came to prominence as the keyboard and freestyle analogue synthesizer player for such artists as Beth Orton, William Orbit, and as a founder member of The Dub Pistols, and Monkey Mafia, and a band member with guitarist Johnny Marr (formerly of The Smiths), soundscape production and keyboards for Michael Brook. Now living in Australia performing and producing music and inventing new art using 3D synthesis to create solid representations of music and sound.

References 

1963 births
English electronic musicians
People from Emsworth
Living people